Anaëlle Angerville (born May 8, 1989) is a French muay thai kickboxer. A professional competitor since 2014, she is the 2022 WMC World −57 kg champion.

Muay thai & kickboxing career
After going to a draw with Dehby, Angerville faced Emma Gongora at Divonne Muaythai Challenge 4 on March 16, 2019. She won the fight by decision. Angerville faced Marine Lefebvre for the FFKMDA −57.1 kg title at Le Choc Des Best Fighters 4 on April 6, 2019. She won her second professional title by decision. Angerville next faced Amel Dehby at Master Fight on May 18, 2019. She won the fight by decision.

Angerville made he Glory debut against Mario Lobo at Glory 70 on October 26, 2019. She won the fight by unanimous decision.

Angerville was booked to face Rebekah Irwin for the vacant WMC World −57 kg title at Muaythai Night 6 on August 11, 2022, following a three-year long absence from the sport. She captured her first major title by decision.

Angerville faced Laura de Blas at Riviera Fight on December 1, 2022. The fight was ruled a draw after the five rounds were contested. On December 29, 2022, Angerville announced that she had left the French national amateur muay thai team, in order to focus on professional competition.

Angerville faced the Enfusion Flyweight champion Nina Van Dalum in a non-title bout at Fight Night One 15 on April 29, 2023.

Professional boxing career
Angerville made her professional boxing debut against Odelia Ben Ephraim on April 3, 2021. She won the fight on points, with a 39–37 scorecard. Her next bout took place just 15 days later, as she faced Daniela Panait on April 18. The fight was ruled a draw by technical decision. Angerville faced the unbeaten Amina Zidani for the Federation Francaise de Boxe France super featherweight title on July 24, 2021. She lost the fight by split decision. Two of the judges scored the bout 77–76 and 78–74 for Zidani, while the third judge awarded Angerville a 77–75 scorecard.

Angerville faced the undefeated Amy Naert on April 30, 2022. She won the fight by majority decision, with two judges awarding her all six rounds of the bout, while the third judge scored had the fight scored as a 57–57 draw. Angerville faced her third unbeaten opponent on May 14, 2022, as she was booked to face Tijana Draskovic. She won the fight by unanimous decision, with three scorecards of 60–54. Angerville faced Eva Cantos on December 15, 2022, in her third and final boxing appearance of the year. She won the fight by unanimous decision.

Angerville faced Odelia Ben Ephraim for the vacant Federation Francaise de Boxe France featherweight title on February 4, 2023. She won the fight by split decision. Two of the judges scored the fight 78–74 and 79–73 in her favor, while the third judge awarded Ben Ephraim a 77–75 scorecard. Angerville next faced the undefeateed Caroline Veyre on March 17, 2023. She lost the fight by unanimous decision.

Championships and accomplishments
Professional
Académie Française de Muay Thaï
2015 AFMT National −57 kg Championship
Fédération Française de Kickboxing, Muaythai et Disciplines Associées
2019 FFKMDA −57 kg Championship
World Muaythai Council
2022 WMC World −57 kg Championship

Amateur
International Federation of Muaythai Associations
 2016 IFMA European Championships −60 kg 
 2016 IFMA Royal World Cup in Kazan -60kg 
 2018 IFMA World Championships −57 kg 
 2018 IFMA European Championships −57 kg 
 2019 IFMA Arafura Games −57 kg 
 2019 IFMA World Championships −57 kg 
 2021 IFMA World Championships −57 kg

Fight record

|-  style="background:#"
| 2023-04-29 || ||align=left| Nina Van Dalum || Fight Night One 15 || Saint-Étienne, France || ||  || 
|-
|-  style="background:#c5d2ea"
| 2022-12-01 || Draw ||align=left| Laura de Blas || Riviera Fight || Puget-sur-Argens, France || Decision || 5 || 3:00
|-
|-  style="background:#cfc"
| 2022-02-26 || Win ||align=left| Rebekah Irwin || Muaythai Night 6 || Dubai, United Arab Emirates || Decision || 5 || 3:00
|-
! style=background:white colspan=9 |
|-
|-  style="background:#cfc"
| 2019-10-26 || Win ||align=left| Maria Lobo || Glory 70: Lyon || Lyon, France || Decision (Unanimous) || 3 || 3:00
|-
|-  style="background:#cfc"
| 2019-05-18 || Win ||align=left| Amel Dehby || Master Fight || Chalon-sur-Saône, France || Decision || 3 || 3:00
|-
|-  style="background:#cfc"
| 2019-04-06 || Win ||align=left| Marine Lefevbre || Le Choc Des Best Fighters 4 || Asnières-sur-Seine, France || Decision || 5 || 3:00
|-
|-  style="background:#cfc"
| 2019-03-16 || Win ||align=left| Emma Gongora || Divonne Muaythai Challenge 4 || Divonne-les-Bains, France || Decision || 3 || 3:00
|-
|-  style="background:#c5d2ea"
| 2019-02-23 || Draw ||align=left| Amel Dehby || Stars Night || Vitrolles, France || Decision || 3 || 3:00
|-
|-  style="background:#cfc"
| 2018-12-01 || Win ||align=left| Marine Lefevbre || Night Of Si'Fight 1 || Troyes, France || Decision || 5 || 3:00
|-
|-  style="background:#cfc"
| 2018-10-20 || Win ||align=left| Yang Yang || Glory of Heroes 36: Ziyang || Sichuan, China || Decision (Unanimous) || 3 || 3:00
|-
|-  style="background:#fbb"
| 2018-10-06 || Loss ||align=left| Christi Brereton || Roar Combat League 10 || London, United Kingdom || Decision || 5 || 3:00
|-
|-  style="background:#fbb"
| 2018-04-97 || Loss ||align=left| Nora Cornolle || Finales Championnat De France Pro || Saint Ouen, France || Decision (Split) || 5 || 3:00
|-
! style=background:white colspan=9 |
|-
|-  style="background:#fbb"
| 2018-02-10 || Loss ||align=left| Nora Cornolle || The Diamond II || Drancy, France || Decision || 5 || 3:00
|-
|-  style="background:#cfc"
| 2017-12-02 || Win ||align=left| Eulalia Palaez || La 13ème Nuit Du Muay Thai || Saint-Pryvé-Saint-Mesmin, France || Decision (Unanimous) || 3 || 3:00
|-
|-  style="background:#fbb"
| 2017-04-01 || Loss ||align=left| Nora Cornolle || Konateam Tournament || Villiers-sur-Marne, France || Decision || 5 || 3:00
|-
|-  style="background:#cfc"
| 2017-02-18 || Win ||align=left| Anna Grande || Apash Tournament || Vaulx-en-Velin, France || TKO (Retirement) || 2 || 3:00
|-
|-  style="background:#fbb"
| 2016-06-11 || Loss ||align=left| Bernise Alldis || Muay Thai Grand Prix 5 || London, United Kingdom || Decision (Unanimous) || 5 || 3:00
|-
|-  style="background:#cfc"
| 2016-05-28 || Win ||align=left| Sandy Manfrotto || LFC 6 || Villeurbanne, France || Decision || 5 || 3:00
|-
|-  style="background:#cfc"
| 2016-05-07 || Win ||align=left| Florence Delaroche || Trophée Somsong/Joe Prestia || Saint-Gilles, Gard, France || TKO || 2 ||
|-
|-  style="background:#cfc"
| 2016-04-09 || Win ||align=left| Jennifer Colomb || Golden Fight 4, Tournament Final || La Courneuve, France || Decision || 5 || 3:00
|-
! style=background:white colspan=9 |
|-
|-  style="background:#cfc"
| 2016-04-09 || Win ||align=left| Maria Lobo || Golden Fight 4, Tournament Semifinal || La Courneuve, France || Decision || 5 || 3:00
|-
|-  style="background:#cfc"
| 2015-10-24 || Win ||align=left| Morgan Fichet-Delavault || Gala de Boxe Thaï || Cesson-Sévigné, France || Decision || 5 || 3:00
|-
|-  style="background:#cfc"
| 2015-02-21 || Win ||align=left| Malika Machtoune || Gladiators Battle || Montluçon, France || TKO || 1 ||
|-
! style=background:white colspan=9 |
|-
|-  style="background:#cfc"
| 2015-02-07|| Win ||align=left| Morgan Fichet-Delavault || Palacio Fight Night || Ivry-sur-Seine, France || Decision || 5 || 3:00
|-
|-  style="background:#cfc"
| 2015-02-07|| Win ||align=left| Vi Srey Khouch || Gala International Boxe Cambodgienne || Chambéry, France || Decision || 3 || 3:00
|-
| colspan=9 | Legend:    

|-  style="background:#fbb"
| 2022-07-15 || Loss ||align=left| Patricia Axling || 2022 World Games, Tournament Quarterfinal || Birmingham, Alabama, U.S. || Decision (Unanimous)|| 3 || 3:00
|-
|-  style="background:#fbb"
| 2021-12-11 || Loss ||align=left| Iman Barlow || 2021 IFMA World Championships, Tournament Final || Kuala Lumpur, Malaysia || Decision (Unanimous)|| 3 || 3:00
|-
! style=background:white colspan=9 |
|-
|-  style="background:#cfc"
| 2021-12-10 || Win ||align=left| Alina Martyniuk || 2021 IFMA World Championships, Tournament Semifinal || Kuala Lumpur, Malaysia || Decision (Unanimous)|| 3 || 3:00
|-
|-  style="background:#cfc"
| 2021-12-07 || Win ||align=left| Graziele da Silva || 2021 IFMA World Championships, Tournament Quarterfinal || Kuala Lumpur, Malaysia || Decision (Unanimous)|| 3 || 3:00
|-
|-  style="background:#fbb"
| 2019-07-28 || Loss ||align=left| Maria Klimova || 2019 IFMA World Championships, Tournament Final || Bangkok, Thailand || Decision (Unanimous)|| 3 || 3:00
|-
! style=background:white colspan=9 |
|-
|-  style="background:#cfc"
| 2019-07-27 || Win||align=left| Taylor McClatchie || 2019 IFMA World Championships, Tournament Semifinal || Bangkok, Thailand || Decision (Unanimous)|| 3 || 3:00
|-
|-  style="background:#cfc"
| 2019-07-25 || Win||align=left| Viktoriia Korkoshko || 2019 IFMA World Championships, Tournament Quarterfinal || Bangkok, Thailand || Decision (Unanimous)|| 3 || 3:00
|-
|-  style="background:#cfc"
| 2019-07-22 || Win||align=left| Nina Scheucher || 2019 IFMA World Championships, Tournament Opening Round || Bangkok, Thailand || Decision (Unanimous)|| 3 || 3:00
|-
|-  style="background:#cfc"
| 2019-06-16 || Win||align=left| Kristina Sandrkina || 24th Bestfighter World Cup, Tournament Final || Rimini, Italy || Decision || 3 || 2:00
|-
! style=background:white colspan=9 |
|-
|-  style="background:#cfc"
| 2019-06-14 || Win||align=left| Natalia Babintseva || 24th Bestfighter World Cup, Tournament Semifinal || Rimini, Italy || Decision || 3 || 2:00
|-
|-  style="background:#cfc"
| 2019-05-01 || Win||align=left| Rebecca Rooney || 2019 IFMA Arafura Games, Tournament Final|| Darwin, Northern Territory, Australia || Decision (Unanimous)|| 3 || 3:00
|-
! style=background:white colspan=9 |
|-
|-  style="background:#cfc"
| 2019-04-30 || Win||align=left| Viktoriia Ivanets || 2019 IFMA Arafura Games, Tournament Semifinal || Darwin, Northern Territory, Australia || Decision (Unanimous)|| 3 || 3:00
|-
|-  style="background:#cfc"
| 2019-04-28 || Win||align=left| Nina Scheucher || 2019 IFMA Arafura Games, Tournament Quarterfinal|| Darwin, Northern Territory, Australia || Decision (Unanimous)|| 3 || 3:00
|-
|-  style="background:#cfc"
| 2018-07-07 || Win ||align=left| Viktoriia Ivanets || 2018 IFMA European Championships, Tournament Final || Prague, Czech Republic || Decision (Unanimous)|| 3 || 3:00
|-
! style=background:white colspan=9 |
|-
|-  style="background:#cfc"
| 2018-07-04 || Win ||align=left| Natalia Diachkova || 2018 IFMA European Championships, Tournament Semifinal|| Prague, Czech Republic || Decision (Unanimous)|| 3 || 3:00
|-
|-  style="background:#cfc"
| 2018-07-02 || Win ||align=left| Evelina Wikner || 2018 IFMA European Championships, Tournament Quarterfinal || Prague, Czech Republic || Decision (Unanimous)|| 3 || 3:00
|-
|-  style="background:#fbb"
| 2018-05-18 || Loss ||align=left| Martine Michieletto || 2018 IFMA World Championships, Tournament Final || Cancun, Mexico || Decision (Unanimous)|| 3 || 3:00
|-
! style=background:white colspan=9 |
|-
|-  style="background:#cfc"
| 2018-05-16 || Win||align=left| Maria Klimova || 2018 IFMA World Championships, Tournament Semifinal || Cancun, Mexico || Decision (Unanimous)|| 3 || 3:00
|-
|-  style="background:#cfc"
| 2018-05-14 || Win||align=left| Viktoriia Ivanets || 2018 IFMA World Championships, Tournament Quarterfinal || Cancun, Mexico || Decision (Unanimous)|| 3 || 3:00
|-
|-  style="background:#cfc"
| 2018-05-13 || Win||align=left| Erin Jimenez || 2018 IFMA World Championships, Tournament Opening Round|| Cancun, Mexico || Decision (Unanimous)|| 3 || 3:00

|-  style="background:#fbb"
| 2018-05-07 || Loss||align=left| Gia Winberg || 2017 IFMA World Championships, Tournament Quarterfinals|| Minsk, Belarus || Decision (29:28)|| 3 || 3:00

|-  style="background:#fbb"
| 2017-11-06 || Loss ||align=left| Zina Djelassi || 2017 WAKO World Championships, K-1 Tournament Quarterfinal || Budapest, Hungary || Decision || 3 || 2:00

|-  style="background:#cfc"
| 2017-11-04 || Win||align=left| Puchenia Yulya || 2017 WAKO World Championships, K-1 Tournament Opening Round|| Budapest, Hungary || Decision || 3 || 2:00

|-  style="background:#cfc"
| 2017-05-05 || Win||align=left| Olivia Loth || 2017 IFMA World Championships, Tournament Opening Round|| Minsk, Belarus || TKO|| 1 || 

|-  style="background:#fbb;"
| 2016-11-26|| Loss||align=left| Nili Block || IFMA World Cup 2016 in Kazan, Final || Kazan, Russia || Decision || 3 ||3:00
|-
! style=background:white colspan=9 |

|-  style="background:#cfc;"
| 2016-11-24|| Win ||align=left| Saeedeh Ghaffari|| IFMA World Cup 2016 in Kazan, Semi Finals || Kazan, Russia || Decision || 3 ||3:00

|-  style="background:#cfc;"
| 2016-11-22|| Win ||align=left| Tereza Dvorakova|| IFMA World Cup 2016 in Kazan, Quarter Finals || Kazan, Russia || Decision || 3 ||3:00

|-  style="background:#fbb;"
| 2016-10-27|| Loss||align=left| Mariya Valent || IFMA European Championships, Tournament Semifinals || Split, Croatia || Decision || 3 ||3:00
|-
! style=background:white colspan=9 |

|-  style="background:#cfc;"
| 2016-10-23|| Win||align=left| Tereza Dvorakova|| IFMA European Championships, Tournament || Split, Croatia || Decision || 3 ||3:00
|-
| colspan=9 | Legend:

Professional boxing record

See also
 List of female kickboxers

References

1989 births
Female Muay Thai practitioners
French female kickboxers
Sportspeople from Lyon
Glory kickboxers
French Muay Thai practitioners
Living people